Largie Castle is a ruined castle at Rhunahaorine, Argyll and Bute, Scotland.

History
The castle was built by Clan MacDonald of Largie.

After the battle of Rhunahaorine Moss, the castle was razed by the forces of General David Leslie in 1647.

References

Ruined castles in Argyll and Bute
Clan MacDonald of Largie
1647 disestablishments in Scotland